The Oxford Historical Society (OHS) is a text publication society concerned with the history of the city of Oxford and the surrounding area in the historic county of Oxfordshire in southern England.

History 
The Oxford Historical Society was founded in 1884 by a group of Oxford University dons in memory of the Revd John Richard Green.

The society formally became a charity in 2003.

Aims 
The OHS exists to publish archives, historical texts, bibliographical tools and studies about the city and University of Oxford, and the neighbouring villages and towns in Oxfordshire (as it was before 1972). The society seeks out materials from a wide variety of sources for its research. It has published around 140 volumes on the history of Oxford and Oxfordshire, especially concentrating on early records.

The Society is administered by a committee of trustees from the University and city of Oxford.

See also 
 Oxfordshire Architectural and Historical Society
 Oxfordshire Record Society

References

External links 
 Oxford Historical Society website

Organizations established in 1884
Organisations based in Oxford
History of Oxford
History of Oxfordshire
Historical societies of the United Kingdom
Text publication societies
Clubs and societies in Oxfordshire
Charities based in Oxfordshire
1884 establishments in England